is a fictional character in the Final Fight and Street Fighter series of video games. Created by Akira Yasuda for Capcom, Poison first appeared in the original Final Fight alongside a similar character, Roxy, later appearing in Capcom-produced games, media and merchandise related to the Street Fighter franchise. She is voiced by Atsuko Tanaka since the Street Fighter III series and Masae Yumi in SNK vs. Capcom: SVC Chaos.

Originally conceived as a female thug in Final Fight and part of the game's antagonist group, Mad Gear, concerns during the game's development about reactions from North American audiences to fighting women led to the character being re-imagined as a "newhalf". However, that was not considered satisfactory and both Poison and her palette swap Roxy were replaced by the male characters "Billy" and "Sid" and have been for every subsequent North American port of the title on Nintendo consoles and handhelds. After the Final Fight series, she later appeared alongside wrestler Hugo, acting as his manager, with her schemes revolving around finding a tag team partner for him or developing their own wrestling organization. Poison first appeared as a playable character in Final Fight Revenge. She was also to appear in both Capcom Fighting All-Stars and Final Fight: Streetwise; however, the former was canceled and she was omitted from the latter as development progressed. Following those aborted attempts, she ended up appearing as a playable character on Street Fighter X Tekken. She was also added as a playable character to Ultra Street Fighter IV.

The character's potential status as a trans woman, consciously left ambiguous by the developers, has remained a topic of frequent debate by both fans and media alike.

Conception and history
Poison's first appearance in Final Fight featured her and a palette swap character named Roxy as recurring minor enemies for the player to fight. Named after the band by an unnamed female employee at Capcom, she was designed by Akira Yasuda to contrast against the bigger characters in the game and move about randomly and described as a "cool and rebellious woman". According to the book All About Capcom Head to Head Fighting Games and Final Fight director Akira Nishitani, the characters were originally planned to be cisgender women, but were changed to "newhalfs" (a Japanese slang term for trans women) after the game's release, due to the suggestion that "hitting women was considered rude" in America and the concern that feminist groups would sue. However, concept artwork included in the 2005 compilation Capcom Classics Collection of the pair specifically uses the kana for 'newhalf' (ニューハーフ), contradicting the statement the change occurred post-release. In 2007 Nishitani stated that he supposed the character "could be male", but added it was up to the viewer to decide. He later clarified in a discussion on Twitter that in his personal view Poison was a woman. Yasuda himself commented that as far as her gender, he considers her transgender in North American localizations, but cis in Japan.

A later appearance by Poison as a playable character in Final Fight Revenge, an American-produced 3D fighting game spinoff of Final Fight, portrayed the character in a highly feminine manner and had her romantically interested in Final Fight hero Cody. Commentary about her ending in the game in All About Capcom suggested that the character may have received sex reassignment surgery. The Final Fight-related character profiles featured in Capcom Classics Collection instead allude to her being a cross-dresser, while addressing Roxy as a "she" who dislikes Poison's cross-dressing.

Street Fighter IVs producer Yoshinori Ono, when asked in an interview about Poison's gender, stated: "Let's set the record straight: In North America, Poison is officially a post-op transsexual woman. But in Japan, she simply tucks her business away to look female." He later emphasized it again when asked about what female characters could be included in the game Street Fighter IV, stating that it would be too confusing to include her due to the region-specific gender. However, in a 2011 interview with Electronic Gaming Monthly at the Tokyo Game Show, he stated that Capcom "doesn't have a stance technically", and while they wouldn't give an official answer, felt it was up to the viewer to decide. He added that his intent was to please all fans and that the mystery behind her gender was the core of the character. During the same interview, a Capcom representative further added that they worked closely with GLAAD, an organization concerned with the portrayal of LGBT people in media, to ensure "anything that might be offensive has been very tailored to not be" for Poison's portrayal in Street Fighter X Tekken.

Designs 
Yasuda referenced western fashion magazines for Poison and Roxy's designs, specifically Jeanne Basone's appearance as "Hollywood" in professional wrestling magazine G.L.O.W. #1. Poison is shown to be a woman with long, rugged, pink hair. She wears a black cap, a choker, cutoff, blue jean-shorts, red high-heels, and a tanktop cut just below her breasts. In Final Fight Revenge and some artworks, her hair is shown to be purple instead. She wears several armbands around her right arm and has chains and a pair of handcuffs suspended off her shorts. Final Fight Revenge features her also possessing a whip used in attacks, though the character has not been shown with one in other titles or artwork (other than Street Fighter X Tekken and Ultra Street Fighter IV). Poison stands about 5 feet 9 inches (175 cm) tall and has bust/waist/hip measurements of 35-25-35" (88-66-89 cm).

Poison was given a secondary outfit for Capcom Fighting All-Stars alongside her primary classic attire. Made of shiny, silvery material it consisted of boots that extended halfway up her thighs and a combined sleeveless shirt/short skirt with a plunging neckline. Gloves and a small hairband were also added, as well as a belt, with the handcuffs hanging off of it. Her arm straps were removed, though the strap around her neck remained.

The concept art section of the promotional comic for Final Fight: Streetwise showcases an unused Poison redesign by Trent Kaniuga for the game. The design features red hair, a red micro skirt showing a hint of underwear, a jacket, a button-up white shirt showing some of her abdomen, black high-heeled boots, a gold belt, and a wool cap. In August 2006, Kaniuga revealed three additional alternate designs on ConceptArt.org's internet forum; one being the classic look; another being a white button-up shirt with red pants, high-heels, and short hair; and the third keeping the high-heels and pants, but adding shades, returning her hair to full length and swapping the shirt for a jacket with deep cleavage. All four designs use the same color scheme, belt, and handcuffs.

In video games 
Introduced in the original Final Fight, Poison is an orphan from Los Angeles. She enjoys fighting and uses it as a means to stay in shape, making use of her ties with the original Mad Gear Gang to keep herself out of prison. In Final Fight Revenge, her behavior was represented as womanly and sultry, ranging from flirtatious comments to pole dancing. She frames Cody for her assault crimes and gets him arrested by Edi. E, though she later visits him in jail having developed romantic feelings for him. In the Street Fighter III series, she reappears working as a wrestling manager for her friend Hugo, who could not find a tag team partner due to his immense strength. From here their plots would focus on the two searching for a tag partner or starting their own wrestling association, echoed in their SNK vs. Capcom: SVC Chaos appearance. Poison later appeared as a playable character alongside Hugo in Street Fighter X Tekken with similar goals, and in Ultra Street Fighter IV, in which she combined the concept with a rock band theme in her character ending. In Street Fighter V, Poison returns to Metro City after she and Hugo have a falling-out begins searching for a new partner she can make a star, to little success. Ultimately, she and Hugo reconcile and become partners once again.

Poison was also planned to appear both in Capcom Fighting All-Stars and Final Fight Streetwise, though the first game was canceled and she was cut from the second. In Mighty Final Fight, a chibi parody of the character named "Poison Kiss" appears as a generic enemy, a corrupt cop and characterized as her younger sister. Poison has also appeared based on her role as Hugo's manager on cards for SNK vs. Capcom: Card Fighters Clash and the game's Nintendo DS sequel, as well as the related printed trading card game. Poison appears as one of the spectators in the Metro City stage in Marvel vs. Capcom 3: Fate of Two Worlds.

Gameplay

In the original Final Fight, Poison and Roxy both utilized standing and acrobatic flip-kicks to attack the player. As one of the fighters in Final Fight Revenge, her moveset was expanded heavily, and she was armed with a whip. The whip is used primarily in her Cat Claw and Thunder Whip attacks (which are comparable to Shoryuken/Shinryūken styled attacks, respectively), and can be used to steal a weapon from the opponent. Additionally, her handcuffs can be thrown as a horizontal projectile move to immobilize the opponent for a short time.

One particular Final Fight Revenge attack, Poison Kiss, has her blow a large heart-shaped kiss at the opponent that travels in a sine wave path. If it connects, a quick peep show of Poison in several erotic poses is displayed, and afterwards the opponent is shown stunned with hearts dancing over their head. Defeating an opponent with this attack results in Poison doing a pole dance for her win pose, with her whip serving as the pole. Though not playable in the beta test of Capcom Fighting All-Stars, promotional material released by Capcom for the title show that this move would have been retained for her gameplay. However, in Ultra Street Fighter IV, her Poison Kiss follows up with several slaps and a groin kick when it hits the opponent, similar to her Cross Art move from Street Fighter X Tekken.

As for the Street Fighter series, starting from Street Fighter X Tekken, Poison has a unique moveset of her own that mixes agile pro wrestling techniques and her own streetfighting abilities. Poison's standard throws include a multi-hitting slap and a Frankensteiner, Aeolus Edge and Kissed By a Goddess which are the names of her Fireball and Shoryuken-like moves, and Whip of Love which is a multi-hitting whip attack and is done in a similar fashion to Fei Long's Rekkas. Her famous flip kick from the original Final Fight games appears as a special called Love Me Tender. After the flipping axe-kick, Poison can follow this move up with a reverse Frankensteiner (Poison-Rana). In addition, Poison's Super Art is called Love Storm, and starts with her charging a large version of Aeolus Edge. Once it hits, she flips into the air and lands with a hard hitting axe kick that stuns the opponent in a prone position. Afterwards, she repeatedly smacks the opponent with her horsewhip and delivers a final blow that knocks them into the air. Poison also retained her signature backflip from the original game.

Censorship
When Final Fight was ported to the Super Nintendo Entertainment System, an American playtester working for Capcom reviewed the content during the localization process with one of the Japanese designers and objected to the protagonist hitting women. While Akira Yasuda pointed out that the characters had already been made into trans women, believing this to be an acceptable compromise, Poison and Roxy were replaced with regular male punks named "Billy" and "Sid" in the English localization despite his objections. This change has been repeated with every English port to Nintendo consoles, including the Game Boy Advance version Final Fight One and the Wii's Virtual Console. English versions of the Sega CD port censored the characters in a different manner, redrawing both of them with longer shirts and shorts and covering the under-cleavage shown when the characters were struck.

Promotion and reception
Poison has been featured in various promotional Street Fighter related artworks, as early as Street Fighter II. Additionally she has been used as a cameo character three times in the Street Fighter Alpha series. In terms of merchandise, an immovable model was being made for the 2008 Capcom Girls Collection line of figurines by Mitsumasa Yoshizawa, using her Final Fight attire and at 1/6 height, standing nearly 11 inches tall. A similar model was released later on, identical to the previous figurine except with her giving a thumbs down gesture and darker colors. A version with blonde hair was later released as well. In Capcom's press kit for the 2010 release of Final Fight: Double Impact, a pink hair spray was included in tribute to the character, with the text describing it as "For men, women, and everything in between." Capcom later featured her as one of the characters for their Capcom Girls 2011 calendar.

In February 1991, Gamest magazine named her one of the top fifty characters in video games of 1990, placing her twenty-sixth on their list. UGO.com ranked her thirtieth on their "Top 50 Videogame Hotties" list, citing her as "one of the most controversial video game characters to date." Former Tips & Tricks executive editor Wataru Maruyama cited her design as an example of how an outfit is worn compared to its complexity can make a character memorable and stand out, stating "to use a phrase I don’t particularly like to use, she totally worked it." She has also been a subject drawn by non-Capcom artists, such as Falcoon. GameDaily ranked her twenty-third on their "Top 25" list of their favorite Capcom characters, stating of the characters in Final Fight "The Mad Gear gang is a feisty bunch, and we could've picked anyone from the list ... Instead, we selected Poison". GamesRadar named her one of twelve Street Fighter related characters they wished to see in Super Street Fighter IV, arguing that her status should not be an issue against her inclusion and that the character deserved another stand-alone appearance of her own. Later, GamesRadar included her in the list of "The 30 best Capcom characters of the last 30 years". Joystiq named her their favorite character of the Final Fight series, stating that her "hypersexualized appearance and random flipping" made the character memorable, and that the controversy over her gender made the character even more so.

As the exact nature of Poison's status as gender-variant has been left deliberately ambiguous by Capcom, the topic has remained a popular subject for debate among fans and gaming media alike. Electronic Gaming Monthlys Eric L. Patterson described her as being a significant character to the trans community, and a perfect example of how it is "so awkward when it comes to knowing how to deal with characters who aren't white, male, and heterosexual" in video games. Complex pointed her out as an example of stereotypical depiction of trans sex workers, listing Poison among The 15 Most Stereotypical Characters in Video Games. GamesRadar commented "Poison holds a distinction as one of gaming’s first trans characters, which began as a strange choice in localization but has become a part of the character that she wears with pride. If you take issue with it, that’s your problem, not hers. It's that kind of confidence that makes her so appealing."

References 

Characters designed by Akira Yasuda
Fictional criminals in video games
Female characters in video games
Fictional American people in video games
Fictional characters from Los Angeles
Fictional gang members
Fictional transgender women
Fictional whip users
Woman soldier and warrior characters in video games
Final Fight characters
LGBT characters in video games
Street Fighter characters
Video game characters introduced in 1989
Capcom protagonists
Capcom antagonists
Fictional managers